Delphine Zentout (born 4 August 1971) is a French actress. Her film career began with the controversial Catherine Breillat film titled 36 Fillette (1988), a film about a sexually curious 14-year-old's affair with an aging playboy.

Selected filmography
2011: three girls on the run
2008: The ex daughter of Christiane Spiero (TV movie)
2007: Mr Neuwirth, hang
2007: The Predators (TV movie)
2007: Surge
2006: The Clan Pasquier
2006: On the Road to Santiago
2005: The Way of Laura (soap opera)
2005: "The Behind the scenes" (an episode of the series Sauveur Giordano )
2005: New Life Romain
2005: The entertainers (theater)
2004: Justice is done
2004: Let's grandchildren
2004: Joséphine, ange gardien (1 Episode : "Sauver Princesse")
2004: Deadly Violence
2003: San Antonio
2003: It Was a Small Garden
2002: Les Thibault (soap opera)
2002: He runs, he runs the ferret
2002: The Battle of Hernani (TV movie)
2001: "Portrait of a Killer" (one episode of A Woman of Honor )
2001: A Girl in the Blue
2000: Coronation Street (soap opera)
1999: Let Lucie faire!
1999: The Whiplash
1999: "Romeo and Juliet" (an episode of The Instit)
1998: Mrs. Four and Children
1998: Midnight Lace (an episode of the judge and cop Cordier )
1998: The Danger of Love
1997: The Time of Secrets
1997: "Funny Game" (an episode of the series The Judge is a Woman)
1996: The Censor school Epinal
1996: Deemed Innocence (an episode of the series Commissaire Moulin)
1996: Master Driver
1995: Dirty Laundry email family
1994: Farinelli
1994: Taboo
1994: One Day Before Dawn (TV movie)
1993: The Scarlet Eye
1993: Following the Chav
1993: The Unfinished Letter
1992: L'oeil écarlate
1992: The Tricks of Scapin (theater)
1991: The Year FM
1991: Port Bréac'h
1990: Nobody Loves Me
1989: The Hitch-hiker
1989: Hi Lobsters
1988: 36 fillette

References

1971 births
Living people
French film actresses
French television actresses